Enisa Kadić (6 October 1989 – 19 October 2015) was a Bosnian-Austrian model and beauty pageant titleholder who was the winner of the Miss Austria 2013.

Pageantry
Kadic represented Austria at the Miss World 2013 pageant in Bali, Indonesia on 28 September 2013.

Death
Kadić died on 19 October 2015 after sustaining serious head injuries, a lung trauma and pelvic injuries after falling from the Bergisel mountain in Innsbruck, Tyrol while jogging.

A year later, her death was determined to be an apparent suicide or an accident, the result of taking a selfie.

References

1989 births
2015 deaths
People from Bihać
Bosnia and Herzegovina emigrants to Austria
Austrian beauty pageant winners
Miss World 2013 delegates
Accidental deaths in Austria
Accidental deaths from falls
Suicides in Austria
2015 suicides